The Anjuman Sunnat-ul-Jamaat Association (ASJA)  is the largest and most influential Muslim organisation of Trinidad and Tobago. More than 80% of the Trinidadian Muslim belongs to Anjuman Sunnatul jamaat association. It operates 53 mosques, 7 Primary School and 6 secondary schools. The members of this organization are Sunni Hanafi Muslim.

See also
 ASJA Boys' College
 Islam in Trinidad and Tobago

References

 p. 318, Sociology of Religion in India, Rowena Robinson, Sage Publications, 2004.  .
 Denominational primary schooling: The case of Trinidad and Tobago, Clayton G. Mackenzie, International Review of Education 37, #2 (June 1991), pp. 211–226. 
 ASJA condemns Danish cartoons, Trinidad & Tobago's Newsday, February 4, 2006.

External links
 ASJA web page

1936 establishments in Trinidad and Tobago
Islamic organisations based in Trinidad and Tobago
Islamic organizations established in 1936